The Tale of Chinese Medicine ( is a Chinese documentary television series on the culture and history of traditional Chinese medicine directed by Gan Chao and Zheng Bo. It first aired on May 20, 2016, on Jiangsu Television. This documentary which has six episodes introduces the culture and story of various herbs in China and get good reviews from the audience home and abroad.

Background 
With the development of modern medicine, traditional Chinese medicine has received more and more attention in the global medical community. However, many Chinese people still misunderstand traditional Chinese medicine, and they believe traditional Chinese medicine is outdated and isn't effective. The development of traditional Chinese medicine in China also faces many problems, such as resource destruction and lack of learners. Therefore, the director directed this documentary to help enhance the public's understanding of Chinese herbs and traditional Chinese medicine.

Episodes 
The series have six episodes, each which features stories of different kinds of herbs and their special usages as traditional Chinese medicine in clinical practice.

Reception

Awards 
This documentary won the best series of documentary awards in humanities in the third "Golden Panda" International Documentary Festival.

The Chinese medicine culture documentary "The Tale of Chinese Medicine" was presented as the only Chinese medicine propaganda film on the 2nd Ministers Meeting Between China and CEEC.

Audience response 
The Tale of Chinese Medicine attracted high ratings during its nightly airing with a discussion of more than 200 million viewers. It also has an overall approval rating of 85% on Douban.

Li Zhongzhi, director of the Propaganda Department of the State Administration of Radio, Film and Television, said at the seminar that "The Tale of Chinese Medicine" was regarded as a landmark work. It achieved such good ratings and reputation, and produced a very large demonstration effect.

Books 
The accompanying paperback book, The tale of Chinese Medicine, was published by Zhonghua Book Company in January, 2018.

Overseas 
These series are created as an international version to sell overseas. The international version of this documentary is called“China's Amazing Super Herbs”and it is divided into four episodes: "A Band of Sisters", "Old Boys Club", "Super Foods", and "Wise Guides".

References

External links 

 (Chinese)
 The Tale of Chinese Medicine on Sina Weibo (in Chinese)
 The Tale of Chinese Medicine at Iqiyi

Chinese documentary television series
Traditional Chinese medicine